The River Glyme is a river in Oxfordshire, England. It is a tributary of the River Evenlode. At Wootton the Glyme is joined by a tributary, the River Dorn. The Glyme joins the Evenlode just south of the park near Bladon.

The Glyme is dammed at Cleveley, Kiddington, Glympton and Blenheim. At Blenheim, "Capability" Brown used the river to form the lake in front of Blenheim Palace.

The upper part of the Glyme Valley around the river's headwaters is a Site of Special Scientific Interest.

The Glyme Valley Way footpath follows almost the entire course of the river.

The river's name is derived from the Brittonic for "bright stream".

References

External links

Glyme
Glyme
West Oxfordshire District
1Glyme